Cole Oakley (born 25 October 2000) is a professional rugby league footballer who plays as a  for Halifax Panthers in the RFL Championship.

Career

2020
Oakley made his Super League debut in round 14 of the 2020 Super League season for Warrington against the Salford Red Devils.

Newcastle Thunder (loan)
On 24 December 2020 it was announced that Oakley would join Newcastle Thunder on loan

Rochdale Hornets (loan)
On 17 Jun 2021 it was reported that he had signed for Rochdale Hornets in the RFL League 1 on loan

Halifax Panthers
On 8 Nov 2021 it was reported that he had signed for Halifax Panthers in the RFL Championship

References

External links
Warrington profile

2000 births
Living people
Dewsbury Rams players
English rugby league players
Halifax R.L.F.C. players
Hunslet R.L.F.C. players
Newcastle Thunder players
Rochdale Hornets players
Rugby league second-rows
Warrington Wolves players